Euathlus is a genus of South American tarantulas that was first described by Anton Ausserer in 1875. These spiders are medium sized and are usually found in high elevations in the Andes. It is a senior synonym of Paraphysa, and was formerly considered a senior synonym of Brachypelma, but this was later rejected.

Diagnosis 
Males own a palpal bulb with two prolateral keels, with the tip curved retrolaterally. The tibial apophyses has retrolateral spines and a spine on the retrolateral branch which almost reached the apex. And a urticating patch in the center of the opisthosoma, which own mainly type 3 and 4 urticating hairs. Females also can be distinguished by two 4 sided spermathecal receptacles, with sphere like chambers.

Species
 it contains fourteen species, found in Argentina, Chile and Peru:
Euathlus affinis (Nicolet, 1849) – Chile
Euathlus antai Perafán & Pérez-Miles, 2014 – Chile
Euathlus atacama Perafán & Pérez-Miles, 2014 – Chile
Euathlus condorito Perafán & Pérez-Miles, 2014 – Chile
Euathlus diamante Ferretti, 2015 – Argentina
Euathlus grismadoi Ríos-Tamayo, 2020 – Argentina
Euathlus manicata (Simon, 1892) – Chile
Euathlus mauryi Ríos-Tamayo, 2020 – Argentina
Euathlus pampa Ríos-Tamayo, 2020 – Argentina
Euathlus parvulus (Pocock, 1903) – Chile
Euathlus sagei Ferretti, 2015 – Argentina
Euathlus tenebrarum Ferretti, 2015 – Argentina
Euathlus truculentus L. Koch, 1875 (type) – Chile, Argentina
Euathlus vanessae Quispe-Colca & Ferretti, 2021 – Peru

In synonymy 
E. phryxotrichoides (Strand, 1907) = Euathlus truculentus

Nomen dubium 

 Euathlus roseus (Guérin, 1838) - Chile

Transferred to other genera

See also 
 List of Theraphosidae species

References

Theraphosidae genera
Spiders of South America
Taxa named by Anton Ausserer
Theraphosidae